Harmaja is an island and a lighthouse outside Helsinki, south of the Suomenlinna sea fortress. The island has been functioning as a landmark since the 16th century. A landmark structure was built on the island in the 18th century and a light house in 1883. The first lighthouse was only 7.3 m high and it soon proved to be too low. In 1900 the height was doubled by creating a rectangular brick building on a granite base. A large foghorn alerted ships in fog and in bad visibility. Harmaja received the world's first directed and undirected radio beacon in 1936. The lighthouse is fully automated today.

There is also a pilot station on the island.

During the 1952 Summer Olympics this was the center of the Olympic sailing event.

See also
Helsinki Lighthouse

References

External links
1952 Summer Olympics official report. p. 58.
Finnish Maritime Administration: Harmajan majakka

Venues of the 1952 Summer Olympics
Olympic sailing venues
Lighthouses completed in 1883
Lighthouses completed in 1900
Lighthouses in Finland
Buildings and structures in Helsinki
Islands of Helsinki